The Qarabağ 2021–22 season was Qarabağ's 29th Azerbaijan Premier League season and their fourteenth season under manager Gurban Gurbanov. As well as the Azerbaijan Premier League, Qarabağ will also participate in the Azerbaijan Cup and the inaugural season of the UEFA Europa Conference League.

Season overview
On 1 June, Hajiagha Hajili had his loan deal with Zira extended for an additional year.

On 8 June, Mahir Emreli left the club to sign for Legia Warsaw.

On 11 June, Qarabağ announced the signing of Kady on a two-year contract, with the option of an additional year, from Vilafranquense.

On 1 July, Qarabağ announced the signing of Ramil Sheydayev to a two-year contract, from Sabah.

On 16 July, Qarabağ announced the signing of Marko Vešović to a two-year contract, from Legia Warsaw.

On 26 July, Uroš Matić left Qarabağ.

On 29 July, Qarabağ announced the signing of Bahlul Mustafazade to a three-year contract.

On 3 August, Qarabağ announced the return of Richard Almeida on a one-year contract, and Gaspar Panadero from Cádiz on a three-year contract.

On 18 August, Qarabağ announced the signing of Ibrahima Wadji to a three-year contract from Haugesund.

On 15 December, Qarabağ announced the signing of Rustam Akhmedzade on a contract until 30 June 2026, from Mynai.

On 12 January, Qarabağ announced the signing of Luka Gugeshashvili on loan from Jagiellonia Białystok until the end of the season. The following day, 13 January, Qarabağ announced the signing of Leandro Andrade from Cherno More, on a contract until 30 June 2025.

On 31 January, Gaspar Panadero was loaned to AEK Larnaca for the remainder of the season.

On 9 February, Rahil Mammadov was loaned to Zira for the remainder of the season.

Squad

Out on loan

Transfers

In

Loans in

Out

Loans out

Released

Friendlies

Competitions

Overview

Premier League

Results summary

Results by round

Results

League table

Azerbaijan Cup

Final

UEFA Europa Conference League

Qualifying rounds

Group stage

Knockout round play-off

Squad statistics

Appearances and goals

|-
|colspan="14"|Players away on loan:

|-
|colspan="14"|Players who left Qarabağ during the season:
|}

Goal scorers

Clean sheets

Disciplinary record

References

External links 
 Official Website

Qarabağ FK seasons
Qarabağ
Azerbaijani football clubs 2021–22 season